The following is a list of clubs who have played in the Algerian Ligue Professionnelle 1 since its formation in 2010 to the current season. All statistics here refer to time in the Ligue Professionnelle 1 only, with the exception of 'Most Recent Finish' (which refers to all levels of play) and 'Last Promotion' (which refers to the club's last promotion from the second tier of Algerian football). For the 'Top Scorer' column, those in bold still play in the Ligue Professionnelle 1 for the club shown. Ligue Professionnelle 1 teams playing in the 2016–17 season are indicated in bold, while founding members of the Ligue Professionnelle 1 are shown in italics. If the longest spell is the current spell, this is shown in bold, and if the highest finish is that of the most recent season, then this is also shown in bold.

As of the 2016–17 season, a total of 28 teams have played in the Ligue Professionnelle 1. GC Mascara, MO Constantine, Hamra Annaba, RC Kouba and US Chaouia are the only former top-flight First Division champions that have never played in the Ligue Professionnelle 1

Table

Clubs who have competed in the top flight Championnat National, but not the Ligue Professionnelle 1

Notes

Algerian Ligue Professionnelle 1 Clubs